Vincint Cannady (born 1991), known by the mononym Vincint (stylized as VINCINT), is an American singer and songwriter. He is best known as a finalist on the first season of the singing competition The Four. He released his debut EP, The Feeling on February 14, 2020. Cannady later released his debut studio album, There Will Be Tears on June 11, 2021.

Early life and education  
Vincint Cannady was born and raised in Philadelphia, Pennsylvania. His father was a gospel singer in a group called the Christ United Gospel Singers, and Vincint began singing at the age of five. He was shy about singing as a child, but his father took him to audition for an all-boys choir audition when he was seven to nurture his interest. Cannady also wrote his first song when he was twelve. Vincint was raised Baptist but attended Catholic school growing up. He named Beyoncé, Whitney Houston, Céline Dion, Madonna, Britney Spears, Bjork, and Regina Spektor as early inspirations.

He attended college at Berklee College of Music and graduated in 2013.

Career

2018–2020: The Four and The Feeling 
Vincint appeared on the first season of The Four one week before the finale, where he received unanimous "yes" votes from every judge after performing "Creep" by Radiohead. He stated in an interview that producers attempted to persuade him to sing gospel and R&B music due to his race, and some male producers refused to work with him. Vincint was eliminated in the first round of the finale competition along with contestant Zhavia Ward.

He released three singles in 2018: "Remember Me", "Mine", and "Marrow", which was his debut single. He released a music video for "Marrow" on February 8, 2018. The video was directed by Jake Wilson and shot in a church in North Hollywood, in an homage to Cannady's upbringing in Catholic school. The latter two singles were produced by Pretty Sister. His singing style ranges from belting to whispery falsetto. He characterizes his genre of music as pop.

On April 5, 2019, Cannady premiered a music video for the single "Please Don't Fall in Love", directed by Jasper Soloff. He released his debut EP, The Feeling, on February 14, 2020. Vincint's song, "Be Me", was selected as the anthem of the fifth season of Queer Eye. He also released the lead single from his debut album, "Hard 2 Forget".

2021–present: There Will Be Tears and The Getaway Tour 
On May 28, 2021, he released the single "Kill My Heart", featuring Parson James and Qveen Herby. He released the second single "Getaway", featuring Tegan and Sara, on June 9. Cannady released his debut album There Will Be Tears on June 11, 2021. Ari Shapiro of All Things Considered referred to the album as "vulnerable and danceable". The Getaway Tour is Cannady's debut concert tour, in support of his debut studio album, There Will Be Tears. The tour was originally set to run from January 12 to January 30, 2022, but was rescheduled due to COVID-19. Vincint announced the rescheduled dates of The Getaway Tour, which ran from May 5 to May 29, 2022. He performed the song "Mission" on the Love, Victor season three soundtrack, which was released on June 15, 2022.

Personal life 
Cannady is openly gay, and came out when he was sixteen.

Discography

Studio albums

Extended plays

Singles

Filmography

Television

Awards and nominations

References

External links 
Vincint on IMDb
Vincint on Discogs

1991 births
Living people
21st-century American singers
21st-century African-American male singers
African-American songwriters
American male pop singers
Singers from Pennsylvania
American LGBT singers
LGBT African Americans
LGBT people from Pennsylvania
American gay musicians
Berklee College of Music alumni
21st-century American male singers
20th-century American LGBT people
21st-century American LGBT people